Sarah Louise Mathew ( 1805? – 14 December 1890) was a New Zealand diarist. She was born in London, England to Ann Constant Strange and Richard Mathew (1765–1839). She had two sisters and two brothers, including George Felton Mathew, a friend of the poet John Keats. Her exact birth date is unknown, but she was baptised in 1805. On 21 January 1832 she married her cousin, Felton Mathew in Sydney, Australia. All their children were stillborn. Her husband was New Zealand's first Surveyor General.

References

Bibliography 

 
  
 

1805 births
1890 deaths
English emigrants to New Zealand
New Zealand diarists
Women diarists
19th-century New Zealand writers
19th-century New Zealand women writers
19th-century diarists